John FitzPatrick, 1st Earl of Upper Ossory (1719 – 23 September 1758) was an Anglo-Irish nobleman who lived in County Cork, Ireland.

He was the son of Richard FitzPatrick, 1st Baron Gowran, and Anne ( Robinson) and educated at Queen's College, Oxford. 

He succeeded his father as 2nd Baron Gowran in 1727 and his mother to the estates of Farmingwoods (now Fermyn Woods), Northamptonshire and Ampthill, Bedfordshire in 1744. He was created Earl of Upper Ossory in the Irish peerage on 5 October 1751. He was MP for Bedfordshire from 1753 to 1758.

He married Lady Evelyn Leveson-Gower, daughter of the 1st Earl Gower, on 29 June 1744. They had four children:
 John FitzPatrick, Lord Gowran, later 2nd Earl of Upper Ossory (1745–1818)
 The Hon. Richard FitzPatrick (24 January 1748 – 25 April 1813)
 The Lady Mary FitzPatrick (bef. 1751 – 6 October 1778), married the 2nd Baron Holland and had issue.
 The Lady Louisa FitzPatrick (1755 – 7 August 1789), married the 2nd Earl of Shelburne (later the 1st Marquess of Lansdowne) and had issue including Henry Petty-Fitzmaurice, 3rd Marquess of Lansdowne.

References

External links
Fitzpatrick – Mac Giolla Phádraig Clan Society
thePeerage.com

1719 births
1758 deaths
People from County Cork
18th-century Irish people
Members of the Parliament of Great Britain for English constituencies
Whig members of the Parliament of Great Britain
British MPs 1747–1754
British MPs 1754–1761
Earls in the Peerage of Ireland
John